Hooghly Collegiate School was founded in 1812 as the Hooghly College and is one of the oldest schools in India and the oldest in West Bengal.

History

HCS's early provenance is sketchily documented in Karuņāsāgar Vidyāsāgar, quoting from 'Education Committee' reports, periodicals and other print media of that period. 

The name of the school changed once or twice, till it came to be known as 'Hooghly College' and thence 'Hooghly Collegiate School' when the college wing was created. The location underwent changes, too. The so-called 'new building' (to the 'Ṣāṇḍeśvar Talā' end of the prayer ground, to house the laboratories and the classes IX to XI of the new Higher Secondary scheme) and the box-like, stand-alone crafts-cum-smithy building were completed in 1956-57. The oldest building of the school and part of the adjoining Mohsin College were Hazi Mohammad Mohsin's personal property.

Notable alumni
 Bankimchandra Chattopadhyay (1838–1894)
 Dwarka Nath Mitra (1833–1874)
 Ramesh Chandra Majumdar (1888-1980)
 Brahmabandhab Upadhyay (1861–1907)

In popular culture
In author Suman Sen's 2017 horror-comedy book Koto Bhoot! Ki Adbhut!, the main protagonist Batuk babu was an alumnus of this school. 

High schools and secondary schools in West Bengal
Schools in Hooghly district
Educational institutions established in 1812
1812 establishments in India